The A-Team is an NBC television series that aired from 1983 to 1987.

The A-Team may also refer to:

Arts, entertainment, and media

Music

Groups
 The rap/ hip-hop duo, consisting of Aceyalone and Abstract Rude
 The Nashville A-Team, a group of session musicians in the 1950s and 1960s

Songs
 "The A Team" (Barry Sadler song), 1966
 "The A Team" (Ed Sheeran song), 2011
 The A-Team#Theme song, single by Mike Post, 1984
 "The A-team", a song by Conflict from the album The Final Conflict. 1996
 "A-Team", a song by Travis Scott, 2016

Other uses in arts, entertainment, and media
 The A-Team (comics), various comics based on the TV series
 The A-Team (film), a 2010 feature film based on the TV series
 The A-Team, 1980's ZX Spectrum video game

Other uses
 A-Team (Special Forces), a company subunit of U.S. Army Special Forces
 Athletes in Temporary Employment as Agricultural Manpower, a short-lived 1964 program to replace migrant labor with high school students developed by U.S. Secretary of Labor W. Willard Wirtz
A-Team, the name for the rugby league reserve team
 Ateam Inc., a Japanese Internet company
 Clerkenwell crime syndicate, also known as the A-team, a London criminal gang
 The A-Team company which developed Action Quake 2

See also
Team A, a sub-group of Japanese girl group AKB48
List of A1 Grand Prix teams